The Berlin Police (formerly Der Polizeipräsident in Berlin) is the Landespolizei force for the city-state of Berlin, Germany. Law enforcement in Germany is divided between federal and state (Land) agencies.

The Berlin Police is headed by the Polizeipräsident (Chief of Police), Dr. Barbara Slowik. Her deputy is Police Vice-Chief Marco Langner. They are supported in the management of the force by the Staff Office of the Police Chief, the commanders of the five Local Divisions, the Division for Central Tasks, the Criminal Investigation Department, and the Central Services Division and the Academy of Police.

History

The Royal Prussian Police of Berlin was founded on 25 March 1809, with Justus Gruner as the first chief of police.

In March 1848, Berlin was one of the places where the Revolution of 1848 took place (also called the March Revolution). At this time, just a small number of police officers (approx. 200 officers for 400,000 citizens) with limited authority, the so-called Revierpolizei (literally "police station police"), existed. To fight the revolution, the chief of police, police commissioner Dr. Julius Freiherr von Minutoli, asked the Prussian Army for help. They sent two guard cavalry regiments (the Regiment Gardes du Corps cuirassiers, and the 1. Garde-Dragoner Regiment Königin Victoria von Großbritannien und Irland dragoons), and three guard infantry regiments (the 1. und 2. Garderegiment zu Fuss, and the Kaiser Alexander Garde-Grenadier-Regiment Nr.1). Approximately 230 citizens were shot or killed by sabers, because the guard troops had orders to immer feste druff ("strike them hard"). After a couple of days, the troops withdrew and a militia (Bürgerwehr) with a strength of 20,000 men was founded. In short, the militia was worthless.

Shortly after the revolution, King Frederick William IV of Prussia founded the Königliche Schutzmannschaft zu Berlin in June 1848. It was the first modern police force in Germany from the viewpoint of then and today. It consisted of 1 Oberst (colonel), 5 Hauptleuten (captains), 200 Wachtmeister (sergeants) and 1,800 Schutzleute (officers), 40 of them mounted.

After the German Revolution of 1918-19 at the end of World War I, the police fell under the control of the far-left USPD politician Emil Eichhorn. However, the government of the Free State of Prussia voted to replace him with the Majority Social Democrat Eugen Ernst, an event which led to the Spartacist uprising of 1919. Under the Weimar Republic, the Berlin Police was often more willing to suppress far-left paramilitary groups such as the Communist Party of Germany's Roter Frontkämpferbund than right-wing ones such as the NSDAP's Sturmabteilung or the German National People's Party's Der Stahlhelm. In May 1929, the Berlin Police suppressed a Communist International Worker's Day demonstration in Blutmai. After seizing control of Prussia in the 1932 Preußenschlag, Franz von Papen dismissed Police Chief Albert Grzesinski for his Social Democratic loyalties and replaced him with Kurt Melcher, with the political police section falling under the control of Rudolf Diels.

After Adolf Hitler's rise to power and the beginning of the Gleichschaltung in 1933, political dissidents and Jews were dismissed from the service through the Law for the Restoration of the Professional Civil Service. Diels' Berlin political police, as well as other the Prussian Secret Police, were merged into the Gestapo under Hermann Göring's command. Göring also issued an order to police forces in Prussia, including Berlin, recognizing right-wing paramilitaries such as the SS, the SA, and Der Stahlhelm as Hilfspolizei with authority to help police arrest and harass political dissidents and imprison them in concentration camps. The Berlin Police were placed under the authority of Wolf-Heinrich Graf von Helldorff, a fanatical former SA-Obergruppenführer. The Nazi regime won the support of the Berlin Police by praising police in official propaganda.

In 1936, the Berlin police force was dissolved, like all other German police forces, and absorbed into the Ordnungspolizei (Orpo). The Orpo was established as a centralized organisation uniting the municipal, city, and rural uniformed forces that had been organised on a state-by-state basis. Eventually, the Orpo absorbed virtually all of the Third Reich's law enforcement and emergency response organisations, including fire brigades, coast guard, civil defense, and even night watchmen. It was under the overall command of Heinrich Himmler. In Berlin after the passage of Nuremberg Laws, the Berlin Orpo helped segregate Jews through heavy-handed enforcement of traffic laws. They also assisted the SA in the Kristallnacht pogrom.

During the Allied occupation of Berlin, the Soviet Union and the Communist Socialist Unity Party of Germany took control of the Berlin Police, and the politicization of the police led to three-quarters of the police to switch to a new authority in West Berlin. Police brutality by East Berlin Police against the Berlin city council and anti-Communist demonstrators in East Berlin led to the formal partition of the city. After the fall of the Berlin Wall (1989) and the reunification of Germany (1990), the West Berlin police, with 20,000 employees, and the East Berlin police, with 12,000 employees, were merged under the direction of the West Berlin chief Georg Schertz. Approximately 2,300 officers changed assignments from the West to the East, and approximately 2,700 from the East to the West. About 9,600 East Berlin officers were checked for being possible collaborators of the MfS (Stasi). 8,544 of them were cleared, while 1,056 were not. Approximately 2,000 were retired or resigned on their own.

The law on the Freiwillige Polizei-Reserve Berlin (volunteer police reserve) of 25 May 1961 in West Berlin created a paramilitary organisation to protect important infrastructure like power plants and drinking water supplies. Since the 1980s, it became more of a branch in which citizens were able to voluntarily support the Schupo in daily service. It was disbanded in 2002.

Police chiefs
List of police chiefs since 1809:

1809–1920

Greater Berlin: 1920–1948

Divided Berlin: 1948–1990

Since 1990

Organisation

Berlin Police is headed by the Police President and divided into 4 main directorates: 
Berlin Police Directorate 
Criminal Investigation Department 
Police Academy 
Central Services Directorate

Berlin Police Directorate 
Berlin Police Directorate is divided into 5 local directorates (Direktion), one Division Operations/Traffic Management and one Division Central Special Services.

Local directorates 
Each local directorate is responsible for one to three Berliner districts:
Direktion 1: Reinickendorf, Pankow
Direktion 2: Spandau, Charlottenburg-Wilmersdorf, Mitte West
Direktion 3: Marzahn-Hellersdorf, Treptow-Köpenick, Lichtenberg
Direktion 4: Tempelhof-Schöneberg, Steglitz-Zehlendorf, Neukölln
Direktion 5: Friedrichshain-Kreuzberg, Neukölln, Mitte East

Each Direktion had several police stations ("Abschnitte", all in all 38) where the patrol car staff (Schutzpolizei/Schupo) is located. Other sub departments of a Direktion are (not all listed):
Referat Verbrechensbekämpfung - detective branch (Kriminalpolizei/Kripo) and plainclothes units of the Schupo.
Referat Zentrale Aufgaben - central services:
Verkehrsdienst - traffic police
Direktionshundertschaft - a company of special police
Diensthundführer - K9

Other divisions 
The Division Operations/Traffic Management has the following subbranches:
Bereitschaftspolizei (BePo) – Uniformed units (two battalions, each with 4 companies and an engineer unit) that provide additional manpower for the Schupo, natural disasters, sporting events, traffic control or demonstrations (riot/crowd control).
Wasserschutzpolizei (WSP) – The river police for patrolling rivers, lakes, and harbours.
Zentraler Verkehrsdienst – The traffic police with many sub departments for (just examples): Honor escorts during state visits, Autobahnpolizei (highway police), tracing of vehicles without insurance or known drivers without a license, specialized units for the controlling of vehicles with hazardous materials,
Diensthundführer – K9
Polizeihubschrauberstaffel Berlin (PHuSt BE) – The Berlin Police run a Eurocopter EC135 helicopter together with the Bundespolizeipräsidium Berlin.

The Division Central Special Services has the following subbranches: 
Objektschutz – The Berlin Police has a special branch for the guarding of buildings, especially embassies or watch over and transport convicts. These non-sworn officers are employees with limited police authority. They are armed and wear the same uniform as the Schupo but different rank insignia.
Gefangenenwesen – Custody

Criminal Investigation Department 
The Criminal Investigation Department (Landeskriminalamt - LKA) is responsible for investigating the most serious crimes (exclusive tasks of the LKA like crimes against the constitution, organised crime, youth gangs or political motivated crime) and works closely with the six local directorates. The LKA supervises police operations aimed at preventing and investigating criminal offences, and coordinates investigations involving more than one Direktion.

Dedicated to the LKA:
Spezialeinsatzkommando (SEK) - The SWAT teams of the German state police. 
Mobiles Einsatzkommando (MEK) - The MEKs are plainclothes teams of the LKA with special tasks like mentioned above and special manhunt units
Personenschutzkommando – Personal security plainclothes unit, protecting politicians and VIPs

Police Academy 
The general education and training are in charge through the police academy in Berlin.

Central Services Directorate 
The Central Services Directorate is responsible for all administrative and logistical support, like financial services, HR, facility management or ICT.

Workforce

 17,041 police officers in uniform and plain clothes (2017)
 2,526 security guards, prison-officers and staff in other law-enforcement related areas (2017)
 2,778 administrative staff, including management and clerical staff, technical staff and scientists of various disciplines (2017)
 2,808 apprentices and trainees (2017)
 2,500 vehicles (2017)
 1.545 Billion Euro annual budget (2019)

See also

 Babylon Berlin
Politics in Berlin
List of law enforcement agencies in Germany
Law enforcement in Germany 
Landespolizei (German state police forces)
Stadtpolizei (German municipal police forces)

References

External links

 Berlin Police official website
Berlin Police logo (from De.wiki)
Berlin: Metropolis of crime 1918 - 1933 Part 1, Part 2 (warning: graphic depiction of murder and other violence), a Deutsche Welle English television documentary discussing advances in police methods and forensic technology, corruption in the police force, and selected investigations in Berlin during the early interwar period.

Police
State law enforcement agencies of Germany
1809 establishments in Prussia
Organisations based in Berlin
Organizations established in 1809